Henry Mohoanyane (born 11 August 1963) is a Lesotho sprinter. He competed in the men's 400 metres at the 1992 Summer Olympics.

References

1963 births
Living people
Athletes (track and field) at the 1992 Summer Olympics
Lesotho male sprinters
Olympic athletes of Lesotho
Place of birth missing (living people)